The thyroepiglottic ligament is an intrinsic ligament of the larynx. It connects the stalk of the epiglottis to the angle formed by the two laminæ of the thyroid cartilage, a short distance below the superior thyroid notch.

References 

Ligaments of the head and neck